Willy Sundblad (2 November 1917 – 26 May 1974) was a Norwegian footballer. He played in two matches for the Norway national football team from 1939 to 1948.

References

External links
 

1917 births
1974 deaths
Norwegian footballers
Norway international footballers
Place of birth missing
Association footballers not categorized by position